The Solicitor General of Puerto Rico is the attorney who represents the Commonwealth of Puerto Rico in all civil and criminal matters in which it is a party or has an interest, and which are handled on appeal or in any other manner in any territorial court of Puerto Rico, U.S. federal court, or state/territorial court of another jurisdiction. The Solicitor General reports directly to the Secretary of Justice of Puerto Rico and leads the Office of the Solicitor General of Puerto Rico. The current Solicitor General is Fernando Figueroa Santiago.

Solicitors General
 1959-1967: Juan B. Fernandez-Badillo
 1968-1969: Rafael Rivera Cruz
 1969-1972: Gilberto Gierbolini-Ortiz
 1973-1976: Miriam Naveira de Rodón
 1977-1982: Héctor Rivera Cruz
 1985-1989: Rafael Ortiz Carrión
 1989–1991: Jorge E. Pérez-Díaz
 1991-1992: Anabelle Rodríguez Rodríguez
 1993-1996: Pedro A. Delgado Hernández
 1997-1999: Carlos Lugo Fiol
 1999-2000: Gustavo A. Gelpí
 2000-2000: Luis Cotto Roman
 2001-2004: Roberto Sánchez Ramos
 2005-2008: Salvador J. Antonetti Stutts
 2008-2008: Maite Oronoz Rodríguez
 2009-2010: Irene Soroeta Kodesh
 2011-2012: Luis R. Román Negrón
 2013–2017: Margarita Mercado Echegaray
 2017–2018: Luis R. Román Negrón
 2018–2020: Isaías Sánchez Báez
 2021-current: Fernando Figueroa Santiago

References

Department of Justice of Puerto Rico